Sowton is a village and civil parish east of Exeter in East Devon, England.  It has a population of 639.

Its parish council merged with that of nearby Clyst St Mary in 1976 to form Bishop's Clyst.

St Michael's church was rebuilt in 1844–45, by John Hayward and paid for by John Garratt. He retained the original perpendicular northern  arcade. It is a rare example of an early Victorian Tractarian village church. It is a grade I listed building.

Sowton has an old village centre but serves as a major Exeter suburb, with a large industrial estate, park and ride site and modern housing developments.

The area is located next to the M5 motorway  between junctions 29 and 30, the opposite side from the village and is served by Digby and Sowton railway station.

Most of the industrial estate is covered with large retailers, warehousing and distributing, as well as a small number of manufacturers.  There is also a Park and Ride location for bus services to Exeter city centre. For a number of years there has been an office development on the main road which was left incomplete as the economy took a downturn during construction.

References

External links

Villages in Devon
Industrial parks in the United Kingdom
East Devon District